Dubbing Brothers International Italia is an Italian dubbing studio based in Rome. It is the Italian division of the Saint-Denis based dubbing studio Dubbing Brothers.

The studio produces Italian language dubbed versions of numerous movies and TV shows. Numerous voice actors work at the studio.

Clients
 Warner Bros.
 Disney Character Voices International
 Mediaset
 Nickelodeon

Content
 Inside Out
 The Hangover
 The Hangover Part II
 Over the Hedge
 Castle (TV series)
 No Ordinary Family
 Toy Story 3
 Taken (TV miniseries)
 Legend of the Seeker
 Tinker Bell (film)
 Tinker Bell and the Lost Treasure
 Tinker Bell and the Great Fairy Rescue
 The Book of Masters
 The Boys Are Back (film)
 Star Wars: The Clone Wars (film)
 The Losers
 The Fourth Kind
 Time Squad
 Cars 2
 Bolt (2008 film)
 Tales from Earthsea
 Sheep in the Big City
 Shrek the Third
 Shrek Forever After
 Duck Dodgers
 College Road Trip
 Up (2009 film)
 Morning Light
 The Princess and the Frog
 Alice in Wonderland (2010 film)
 Make It or Break It
 Cougar Town
 Detroit 1-8-7
 Old Dogs (film)
 The Inside
 Ella Enchanted
 The War at Home (TV series)
 Earth (2007 film)
 The Sorcerer's Apprentice (2010 film)
 Phineas and Ferb (Season 1)
 The Boss of It All
 10 Things I Hate About You (TV series)
 The Red Shoes (2005 film)
 Prince of Persia: The Sands of Time
 Secretariat (film)
 Black Swan (film)
 Totò Sapore e la magica storia della pizza
 The Last Song
 Ice Age (2002 film)
 Starstruck (2010 film)
 Balls of Fury
 Wizards of Waverly Place
 Psych
 The Suite Life of Zack & Cody
 The Suite Life on Deck
 Princess Protection Program
 Samurai Girl
 ChalkZone

Dubbers
 Antonella Baldini
 Manuel Meli
 Mattia Nissolino
 Perla Liberatori
 Davide Garbolino
 Luca Dal Fabbro
 Alessandro Quarta
 Davide Perino
 Nanni Baldini
 Massimo Bitossi
 Claudia Razzi
 Domitilla D'Amico
 Gemma Donati
 Letizia Ciampa
 Paolo Vivio
 Monica Ward
 Leonardo Graziano
 Davide Albano
 Pino Insegno
 Davide Lepore
 Ilaria Latini
 Tonino Accolla
 Laura Boccanera
 Francesco Pezzulli
 Massimo Corvo
 Fabrizio Manfredi
 Stefano Crescentini
 Ilaria Giorgino
 Gianluca Crisafi
 Valentina Favazza
 Elena Perino
 Francesca Manicone
 Daniele Raffaeli
 Luigi Scribani
 Eva Padoan
 Emanuela Damasio
 Paolo De Santis
 Eugenio Marinelli
 Roberto Stocchi
 Alessandra Korompay
 Antonella Rinaldi
 Roberta De Roberto
 Angelica Bolognesi
 Doriana Chierici
 Stefano De Filippis 
 Edoardo Siravo
 Pinella Dragani
 Angiola Baggi
 Elio Zamuto
 Gaetano Varcasia
 Francesco Prando
 Giò Giò Rapattoni
 Valentina Mari
 Arturo Valli
 Mino Caprio
 Renato Cecchetto
 Emiliano Coltorti
 Marco Baroni
 Laura Romano
 Christian Iansante
 Andrea Mete
 Benedetta Gravina
 Laura Amadei
 Renzo Stacchi
 Roberta Paladini
 Fabrizio Vidale
 Roberto Draghetti
 Edoardo Stoppacciaro
 Marco Vivio
 Alessio Puccio
 Ilaria Giorgino
 Rachele Paolelli
 Orste Baldini
 Dario De Grassi
 Joy Saltarelli
 Stefania Romagnoli
 Roberto Certomà
 Stefano Onofri
 Fabio Valenzi
 Maurizio Fiorentini
 Luigi Morville
 Chiara Gioncardi
 Lorenza Biella
 Alessandro Rossi
 Paila Pavese
 Barbara De Bortoli
 Stella Musy 
 Luca Ward
 Mauro Gravina
 Agnese Marteddu
 Laura Cosenza
 Federica De Bortoli
 Luca Bizzarri
 Danilo De Girolamo
 Paolo Kessisoglu
 Giulia Tarquini
 Monica Vulcano
 Raoul Bova
 Anna Rita Pasanisi
 Alessia Amendola
 Graziella Polesinanti
 Emanuela Rossi
 Pieraldo Ferrante
 Ambrogio Colombo 
 Roberta Greganti
 Gabriele Patriarca
 Alex Polidori
 Massimiliano Manfredi
 Luca Biagini
 Angelo Maggi
 Aurora Cancian
 Georgia Lepore
 Sasha De Toni
 Alessandro Ward
 Simone D'Andrea
 Vladimiro Conti
 Fabrizio De Flaviis
 Saverio Indrio
 Andrea Lavagnino
 Jacopo Castagna
 Gabriele Lopez
 Niseem Onorato
 Franco Mannella
 Davide Chevalier
 Sandro Pellegrini
 Alessia Amendola
 Chiara Colizzi
 Laura Chiatti
 Alex Polidori
 Gianluca Machelli
 Fabrizio Pucci
 Massimiliano Alto
 Pino Ammendola
 Emiliano Coltorti
 Giampaolo Morelli
 Alessio De Filippis
 Franco Mannella
 Giancarlo Giannini
 Mattia Ward
 Monica Vulcano
 Francesca Guadagno
 Micaela Incitti
 Simone Veltroni
 Benedetta Ponticelli
 Gilberta Crispino
 Paolo Marchese
 Emiliano Reggente
 Lorenzo D'Agata
 Lorenzo De Angelis
 Alessio Cigliano
 Barbara Pitotti
 Corrado Conforti
 Sara Labidi
 Simone Crisari
 Emanuela D'Amico
 Ughetta D'Onorascenzo
 Eleonora Reti
 Federico Bebi
 Pietro Ubaldi
 Vittorio Di Prima
 Alessandra Cassioli
 Melina Martello
 Francesco De Francesco
 and others

See also
 Dubbing Brothers Germany
 Dubbing Brothers Belgium

References

External links 
 

Italian dubbing studios
Mass media companies of Italy
Companies based in Rome
Mass media in Rome